Barricade tape is brightly colored tape (often incorporating a two-tone pattern of alternating yellow-black or red-white stripes or the words "Caution" or "Danger" in prominent lettering) that is used to warn or catch the attention of passersby of an area or situation containing a possible hazard. It acts as a minor impediment to prevent accidental entrance to that area or situation and as a result enhances general safety. Barricade tape is also known as construction tape or barrier tape, or in reference to the safety hazard involved as caution tape, warning tape, danger tape or hazard tape. When used by police, the tape is named police tape.

The tape is often wrapped and affixed as a visual warning sign and demarcation, for instance against entering a dangerous area, such as an industrial or commercial building site, a roadworks construction site or the scene of an accident or a crime (for crime scene preservation), or against handling inoperative machinery or appliances.

Description 

Barricade tape is made with durable, resilient, tear-proof plastic materials such as polyethylene, polypropylene, or nylon. Different manufacturers offer different sizes and thicknesses of barricade tape. Barricade tape often has a bright background and pre-printed bold warning text. It is also possible to purchase plain barricade tape and write a custom message on it. However, care should be taken when using custom tape, as barricade tape designs may be required to comply with regulations, such as the Occupational Safety and Health Administration (OSHA) and American National Standards Institute (ANSI) regulations (when used for purposes subject to regulation by these organizations) in the USA.

Types 

Barricade tape is used according to the color specifications set by OSHA and ANSI. Barricade tape may be use primarily as a safety precaution for various industries and procedures.

 Construction tape This is used in construction zones to notify people about ongoing construction and that there are possible hazards within the demarcated area. Construction tape usually employs a yellow-black color combination and incorporates printed text, such as "Under Construction", "Caution", "Work Zone", and "Keep Out" (among others). This type of barrier tape is commonly found at the site of renovations, demolition, and minor repairs.
 Hazard tapeThis is used in locations containing a substantial danger. Examples include electrocution hazards or areas within which there is a risk of exposure to toxic chemicals. In some regions, the specific color combination indicates the type of threat. For example, yellow-black tape may be used to signal the presence of a physical hazard (e.g., a hole), while magenta-yellow can denote a radiation hazard. This type of barrier tape is commonly used in laboratories, production areas, and industrial zones.
 Traffic control device tape This type of barrier tape, as its name implies is used to control traffic, whether foot traffic or vehicle traffic. Traffic control device tapes are used as temporary traffic signal to redirect traffic during parade or whenever a road is closed. These are usually brightly colored, either in solid orange or orange-white combination.
 Police tape or law enforcement tape This type of barrier tape is used to isolate, protect and preserve a crime scene. Police tape is used to notify the public that an investigation is ongoing and that a particular area is restricted. This is usually seen with a yellow-white, yellow-black or blue-white color combination, and usually say “POLICE LINE DO NOT CROSS” or “CRIME SCENE DO NOT CROSS”.
 Firefighter tape This serves the same purpose as police tape and hazard tape. Firefighter tape is used to isolate a particular area during or after a fire to keep the public away from fire-related risks (e.g., smoke inhalation, airborne particulate matter, and damaged structures).

Foreground (tape) and background colours 

The choice of colours of barricade tape depends on the contrast with its background, which in the case of the sky, can vary from black to white. To have a reasonable chance of being visible against most backgrounds, the tape needs a light colour (white or yellow) and a darker colour.

Requirements for barricade tape 

Requirements for barricade tape vary according to the health and safety laws of the country or region it is being used in.

United States 
OSHA and ANSI provide precise specification for barricade tape colors. These are found in OSHA regulations 1910.22 and 1910.144 and ANSI Z535.5-2007, Safety Tags and Barricade Tapes (for Temporary Hazards). However, the dimension, thickness, and materials of the barricade tape are left to the discretion of the manufacturer.

OSHA-specified barricade tape colors 

 Red / white for Fire Prevention and Protection Equipment.
 Black / white for Housekeeping and Aisle Marking
 Magenta / yellow for Radiation Hazards
 Green / white for Safety and First Aid
 Blue / white for Defective Machinery
 Orange / white for Traffic and Caution Warning
 Black / yellow for Physical Hazards

ANSI-specified barricade tape colors 

 Yellow/Black Barricade Tape serves as CAUTION and POTENTIAL HAZARD from:
 Excavation less than 1.2 meters (4 feet) in depth
 Identification of trip hazards and low hanging objects
 Material storage on site
 Red Barrication Tape indicates DANGER and SERIOUS HAZARD from:
 Overhead work
 Live electrical components
 Scaffold under construction
 Around swing radius of equipment with a rotating superstructure
 Magenta (Purple)/Yellow Tape denotes DANGER and POSSIBLE RADIATION EXPOSURE
 Underground warning tape (custom) warns about:
 Digging underground gas-pipeline, electric cable and OFC cable installation
 Custom thickness and width are available 
 Underground work
 Protection from overground work

United Kingdom 

Health and safety regulations state that markings should be placed around obstacles or dangerous locations. This includes where any of the following present a risk:

 people tripping or falling
 objects falling
 people or vehicles colliding with objects

These markings should be made up of alternating red and white or yellow and black stripes of equal size at a 45 degree angle. Barricade tape can be used to satisfy this requirement as long as the tape is "commensurate with the scale of the obstacle or dangerous location in question".

See also
Security tape

References

External links 

 Signs, Signals, and Barricades, Bureau of Reclamation
 Signs, Signals, and Barriers, United States Department of Energy
 Safety Tags and Barricade Tapes , National Electrical Manufacturers Association 

Equipment
Law enforcement equipment
Safety equipment